An annular solar eclipse will occur on February 28, 2101.

Visibility 
The annular eclipse will be over Russia in western Siberia and slightly in the Pavlodar Region of Kazakhstan. The partial eclipse will be visible across China, Japan, Southeast Asia and the subsolar marking will be in Papua New Guinea.

Related eclipses

References 

2101 2 28
2101 2 28
2101 2 28
2100s